Antipino is a rural locality (a selo) and the administrative center of Antipinsky Selsoviet, Togulsky District, Altai Krai, Russia. The population was 1,412 as of 2013. There are 12 streets.

Geography 
Antipino is located on the Chumysh River, 37 km south of Togul (the district's administrative centre) by road. Kolochkovo is the nearest rural locality.

References 

Rural localities in Togulsky District